The Green Leaves of Summer is an album by American jazz pianist Hampton Hawes recorded in 1964 and released on the Contemporary label.

Reception 
The AllMusic review by Scott Yanow states "Pianist Hampton Hawes' first recording after serving five years in prison finds Hawes evolving a bit from a Bud Powell-influenced bop pianist to one familiar with more modern trends in jazz... Recommended".

Track listing
 "Vierd Blues" (Miles Davis) – 5:28
 "The Green Leaves of Summer" (Dimitri Tiomkin, Paul Francis Webster) – 6:18 		
 "Ill Wind" (Harold Arlen, Ted Koehler) – 3:54
 "St. Thomas" (Sonny Rollins) – 3:07
 "Secret Love" (Sammy Fain, Paul Francis Webster) – 5:34
 "Blue Skies" (Irving Berlin) – 5:19
 "The More I See You" (Harry Warren, Mack Gordon) – 5:31 		
 "G.K. Blues" (Hampton Hawes) – 4:08

Personnel
Hampton Hawes – piano
Monk Montgomery – bass
Steve Ellington – drums

References

Contemporary Records albums
Hampton Hawes albums
1964 albums